World of Dance was an American reality competition television series executive produced by Jennifer Lopez. The first two seasons were hosted by Jenna Dewan. The third season saw a change in hosts, as Scott Evans hosted season three and four. The series features dance performers, including solo acts and larger groups, representing any style of dance, competing for a grand prize of $1 million. The contestants are scored by judges Jennifer Lopez, Ne-Yo, and Derek Hough.

The series was created in partnership with the World of Dance enterprise, which produces dance competitions and dance lifestyle events in more than 25 countries, spanning the U.S., Europe, South America, and Asia. Videos captured from these events have driven more than 1 billion views online.

The series premiered on NBC on May 30, 2017. The fourth season premiered on May 26, 2020.

In March 2021, the series was canceled after four seasons.

Premise

Format changes
Season 2

While the format for season two remained relatively unchanged, there were a few slight alterations. Season 2 received a 16-episode order, six more than the ten-episode first season. Additionally, this season, a fourth category, Junior Team, was added for acts under 18 with 5 or more members. The qualifier rounds are cut down from a two minutes to a one-minute routine. The Duels routines are cut down from two minutes to 75 seconds. The top three highest-scoring acts in The Cut from each division will move on to The Divisional Final, in season one it was just the top two. The Cut, Divisional and World Final rounds are cut down from a two minutes to a '90 seconds'-routine. In The Cut and Divisional Final guest celebrities are assigned as mentors to each division. On World Final there are intermezzo shows. Season two by Les Twins, Keone & Mari (actually Mariel) Madrid, Kinjaz and Derek Hough.

Season 3

Original host Jenna Dewan left after the conclusion of season two which left the position open. Access Live co-host, Scott Evans took over as host in the third season. The required qualifier score to enter the duels increased from 80 to 85. The duels feature a redemption round where the Top 2 eliminated acts (in each division) with the highest score compete head to head for a second chance to advance to The Cuts. In the redemption, the 2 acts compete back to back to the same music. Afterwards, the judges vote to decide which act will advance.

In the Divisional Final, the judges pick one more act to advance to the World Final as a wild card. In the World Final, each act performs once instead of twice.

The guest judge is removed this season.

Season 4

The team divisions have now been merged within the Junior and Upper divisions so There are now only 2 divisions; Junior Division and Upper Division.

The scoring system was abolished in favor of votes (this applies for Qualifiers and Duels).

In the Qualifiers, contestants need at least two yeses to proceed to the Duels. Judges may also cast a callback vote which gives the contestants a final chance to perform again to advance to the Duels

In the Duels, contestants no longer choose their opponent. Instead, the judges pick who they are battling and is revealed only upon entering the room. Moreover, a guest judge picks who will perform head-to-head in the Redemption Duels.

In the Cut, contestants are no longer separated by division, instead just some uppers and some juniors in each episode. Another point of interest may be the scores were used to figure out which 2 would make it to the world finals, what was unusual was the fact because of this, there was a chance all of the people in the world finals would be from the same division, also a high scoring team didn't get through but a lower scoring one did, again it wouldn't have been a big deal if the 2 leaderboards were combined.

Another change was they removed the Divisional Finals.

In the world finals, a change of knowing your score after your dance instead of all together at the end.

Show concept
In preparation for season two, handpicked competitors, being talented in any styles of dancing, from qualifying events around the nation and thousands of online submissions, are divided into four  divisions: Junior (groups of 1 to 4, under 18), Upper (groups of 1 to 4, 18 and older), Junior Team (groups of 5+, under 18) and Upper Team (groups of 5+, 18 and older). In some cases dancers who didn't apply were directly contacted by the producers or their agents. The below listed processes can change depending on the season being watched or recorded; however, this layout should fill all the general criteria.

The elimination process of the contestants are in four rounds:

 The Qualifiers - The contestants have to qualify with at least 85 points (80 in seasons 1 and 2) to make it to The Duels.
 The Duels - The contestants choose their opponent starting with the highest scorer from the qualifiers. If the number of contestants in a division is uneven, the last duel will be competed by the three remaining opponents that were unpicked previously. In season 3, they added the redemption where the top 2 eliminated acts go against each other. The winner of the duel is the contestant/s with the highest score who then move on to The Cut.
 The Cut - Mentors are assigned to each division to prepare the contestants for their performances. The top three scoring acts in each division move on to Divisional Final.
 Divisional Final - The mentors still support the contestants from each division. The top scoring act in each division will become division champion and move on to the World Final. It went public later that the division champions got US$50,000 prize money each 3 months after last show airing. Starting in Season 3, the judges send one more act to the World Final as a wild card.

In the World Final all four division champions and one wild card will compete for the US$1,000,000 grand prize. In Season 1 and 2 every act performed twice in two separate rounds with the final score being determined by the average score of both rounds. Starting in Season 3, each act only performed once. The contestant(s) with the highest final score being crowned World of Dance champion and winning the US$1,000,000 grand prize.

Scoring 
The judges are scoring in 5 categories. Each category is worth 20 points, with a perfect score of 100: 
 Performance (20 points): 
 Effort: How many different elements put into the routine without overloading or rushing through it. What was the whole effort to dance the performance by the act.
 Personality: How characters and personality put into the performance, in the sense of acting to stimulate emotions by the audience, telling a story or framing pictures.
 Technique  (20 points):
 Transitions: How smooth and elegant the transitions from move to move were without lacking a performance moment.
 Cleanness: How synchronized, ordered by a pattern, precise and committed the movements were within the act.  
 Execution: How flawless the execution of the performance by the act was to the performance song. 
 Choreography  (20 points):
 Difficulty: How difficult it was to perform the figures and movements by the act from judges point of view.
 Musicality: How well pictures, figures and movements were choreographed to the sound and beat of the performance song.
 Tricks: Are unexpected show elements included by properties, clothing or the bodies of the dancers and how well was it done. 
 Creativity  (20 points):
 Originality: How unique, new, fresh and interesting was the performance. 
 Artistic Choices: What styles of dancing were shown and merged. How well was it done regarding basic dance styles and style culture, e.g. costumes, shoes. The performance song and the use of properties are artistic choices as well. How well did they fit to the performance.
 Dynamics: How energizing and powerful the performance was and how much action was on stage.  
 Presentation  (20 points):
 Crowd Appeal: How the crowd around the show stage reacted to the performance.
 Impact: How memorable, influential and worth talking about it later the performance was.

Production

Development
Jennifer Lopez, who serves as both executive producer and judge, felt that the series would be a return to her roots; Lopez had achieved early fame as a member of  In Living Colors dance crew, The Fly Girls. She explained that dance had been her "first form of artistic expression", and that the series "reminded me of all the reasons why I love dance and why I wanted to do this in the first place".

The series premiere was originally scheduled for May 8, 2017 (as a lead-out for The Voice), but was pushed back to May 30, 2017, to serve as a lead-out for the season premiere of America's Got Talent. On June 29, 2017, NBC renewed the series for a second season, which premiered on May 29, 2018—once again complementing the next season of America's Got Talent.

In May 2018, prior to its season 2 premiere, World of Dance was renewed for a third season; instead of airing as a summer series, it aired at midseason, premiering on February 26, 2019, before it was moved to a new Sunday night timeslot. Host Jenna Dewan announced that she would step down from her role as host for season 3. She was eventually replaced by Access Hollywood co-host Scott Evans. The fourth season premiered on May 26, 2020.

On March 15, 2021, the series was canceled after four seasons.

Series overview

International versions
Legend:
 Currently airing
 Upcoming season
 Awaiting confirmation
 Status unknown
 New season mostly likely but no air dates announced yet
 No longer airing

Awards and nominations

Primetime Emmy Award
Note: The year given is the year of the ceremony

See also 
 So You Think You Can Dance
 Dancing with the Stars
 Dance Dance Dance
 Dance Plus

References

External links

2010s American reality television series
2020s American reality television series
2017 American television series debuts
2020 American television series endings
Dance competition television shows
English-language television shows
NBC original programming
Television franchises
Television series by Universal Television